This is a non-exhaustive list of hairstyles, excluding facial hairstyles.

Short hairstyles

Buzz cuts
A buzz cut is any of a variety of short hairstyles usually designed with electric clippers.

Haircuts are a type of hairstyles where the hair has been cut shorter than before, these cuts themselves can be further modified with other hairstyles.

Long hairstyles
Long hairstyles may be considered those which reach beyond the shoulders on women, and past the chin on men.

Any length styles

See also 
 Eponymous hairstyle
 Hairstyles in the 1950s
 Hairstyles in the 1980s
 Hairstyles of Japanese women
 List of facial hairstyles

References

External links 
 
 

Hairstyles
Hairstyles